Bonomini is an Italian surname. Notable people with the surname include:

 (1903–1986), Italian anarchist
Paolo Vincenzo Bonomini (1757–1839), Italian painter

Italian-language surnames